Haldibari Higher Secondary School is public school. It is located at Haldibari, Nepal VDC. The school was established at 1981 (2038 B.S.) The school has six blocks. This is only one school in Haldibari which gives education up to class 12 in Management, Arts, Education faculty. This is only one school for the centre of  SLC.

Secondary schools in Nepal
Educational institutions established in 1981
1981 establishments in Nepal